Mamidipalli or Mamidipalle is a revenue village in Salur mandal of Vizianagaram district in Andhra Pradesh, India.

Geography
It has an average elevation of 218 metres (718 ft).

References

Villages in Vizianagaram district